The Anaconda–Pintler Wilderness is located in southwestern Montana, in the northwestern United States. It runs for  along both sides of the crest of the Anaconda Range, covering almost . To the north are the Sapphire Mountains, and to the south is the Big Hole Valley. Visitors can most easily access this area via trailheads at Pintler Lake to the south, and at Lutz Creek and Moose Lake to the north. The wilderness lies in parts of Deer Lodge, Granite, Ravalli, and Beaverhead counties.

This segment of mountains was designated as a Primitive Area in 1937, and reclassified as a Wilderness Area in 1964. It is administered jointly by the Beaverhead-Deerlodge and Bitterroot National Forests. In 1964, Montana's Senator Mike Mansfield requested the National Park Service study the area's potential as a national park. The park service declined to pursue the idea. The name is derived from the town and its copper mining company and from Charles and Katie Pintler, homesteaders who in 1885 settled along Pintler Creek between the Big Hole National Battlefield and Wisdom. The forest north of Pintler Pass, including Johnson Lake, was heavily burnt by the Mussigbrod and other fires of 2000.

Recreational opportunities abound. The mountains of this wilderness area and the excellent trail system make it a prime destination for peak baggers. West and East Goat Peaks, Warren Peak, Mount Evans, and Fish Peak are just a few of the  plus peaks that can be scrambled with no technical equipment. Many lakes in this wilderness area are well-stocked with trout and are popular fishing destinations. Popular lakes include Upper Seymour, Edith, Ivanhoe and Johnson Lakes. Wildlife watchers can see mountain goats, Rocky Mountain big horn sheep, and pika.

References

External links
 Anaconda–Pintler Wilderness Information & Maps
 
 
 
 
 
Peak Bagging in the Pintler Wilderness

Wilderness areas of Montana
Beaverhead-Deerlodge National Forest
Bitterroot National Forest
Protected areas of Beaverhead County, Montana
Protected areas of Deer Lodge County, Montana
Protected areas of Granite County, Montana
Protected areas of Ravalli County, Montana
IUCN Category Ib
Protected areas established in 1964
1964 establishments in Montana